The 2011–12 Missouri Mavericks season was the third season of the Central Hockey League (CHL) franchise in Independence, Missouri. On September 17, 2011, the Mavericks announced an affiliation agreement with the Chicago Wolves of the American Hockey League.  On March 23, 2012, the Mavericks clinched a playoff berth with a 5–3 victory against the Bloomington Blaze.  The Mavericks' season ended on April 26, 2012, when they were eliminated in Game 7 of the Turner Cup Conference Finals by the Fort Wayne Komets.

Regular season

Conference standings

Playoffs

Awards, Records, and Milestones

Awards and Records

Milestones

Transactions
The Mavericks have been involved in the following transactions during the 2011–12 season.

Player Signings/Re-Signings/Acquisitions off Waivers/Reactivated from Team Suspension

Player Waivings/Losses to Free Agency/Retirements/Placement on Team Suspension

Trades

Player Transfers to/from Affiliate Team or On Loan from Non-Affiliate Team

See also
 2011–12 CHL season

References

External links
 Missouri Mavericks 2011–12 Regular Season Schedule
 Missouri Mavericks 2012 Postseason Schedule

Missouri Mavericks seasons
Missouri
Missouri
2011 in sports in Missouri
2012 in sports in Missouri